The Invisible Enemy may refer to:
"The Invisible Enemy (The Outer Limits)", a 1964 Outer Limits episode
The Invisible Enemy (Doctor Who), a 1977 Doctor Who serial